Hannah Stevens (born May 9, 1995) is an American competitive swimmer who specializes in backstroke. She is a member of the U.S. National Team and won the 2017 National Championship in the 50-meter backstroke.

Stevens attends the University of Missouri and is an NCAA All-American.

College career
Stevens attends University of Missouri. At NCAAs her junior year, she finished third in the 100 backstroke. She finished behind Kathleen Baker and Olivia Smoliga.

International career
Stevens was first named to the U.S. National team after the 2015 summer and first raced for Team USA at the 2016 USA College Challenge.

She was named to her first international roster after winning the 50-meter backstroke at the 2017 Phillips 66 National Championships, qualifying for the World Championships in Budapest. She placed ninth in the event at World Championships.

Stevens won the silver medal in the 100-meter backstroke at the 2017 Summer Universiade, her first international medal. She went on to win a silver in the 400 medley relay at the meet, as well as a bronze in the 50 backstroke.

Personal bests

References

 http://mutigers.com/roster.aspx?rp_id=4135
 http://www.teamusa.org/News/2017/July/01/Watch-Out-World-A-New-Wave-Of-Talent-Emerges-At-USA-Swimmings-National-Championships

External links
 
 
 Hannah Stevens at Mizzou Swimming

1995 births
Living people
American female backstroke swimmers
Missouri Tigers women's swimmers
Universiade medalists in swimming
Universiade silver medalists for the United States
Universiade bronze medalists for the United States
Medalists at the 2017 Summer Universiade